The West Russian Volunteer Army or Bermontians was a pro-German military formation in Latvia and Lithuania during the Russian Civil War in 1918–20.

History 
The Western Russian Volunteer Army, unlike the pro-Entente Volunteer Army, was supported and in fact created by Germany. The Compiègne Armistice, article 12, stipulated that troops of the former German Empire were to remain in the Baltic provinces of the former Russian Empire to help fight Bolshevik advances and were to withdraw once the Allies determined the situation was under control. The order to withdraw was given after the Treaty of Versailles was signed in June 1919.

However, only a small portion of the Freikorps in the Baltic retired; the rest stayed under the leadership of General Rüdiger von der Goltz. To avoid casting blame on Germany and infuriating the Allies, he withdrew into the background and merged his troops with the "Special Russian Corps", led by Cossack General Pavel Bermondt-Avalov. The two generals recruited about 50,000 men: mostly Freikorps, Baltic Germans, as well as some Russian POWs captured by Germany in World War I and then released on the promise that they would help fight against the Bolsheviks in the Russian Civil War. The Army declared that it joined the forces of Aleksandr Kolchak and marched to attack Bolsheviks, but their real goal was to sustain German power in the Baltic region.

Confrontation with the governments of Latvia and Lithuania 

The political situation in the Baltic region continued to deteriorate. A new government in Lithuania refused to allow White Russians to pass troops through and establish a military base. After initially supporting the White Russians the Weimar government, under pressure from the Entente, banned the transfer of German soldiers to the Russians and ordered the Reichswehr to block the East Prussian border to block Freikorp's supplies. General von der Goltz was finally recalled on October 4.

In this circumstances Bermondt-Avalov launched an offensive using Freikorps in attempt to force the Republic of Latvia to negotiate. With the support of British naval artillery and Estonian armoured train, a Latvian counter-offensive followed in November, which forced Bermondt's army to withdraw. Mitau was also lost in loss-making fights.

In October 1919, the West Russian Volunteer Army attacked the newly independent states of Lithuania and Latvia, to which Germany had granted independence. It briefly occupied the west bank of the Daugava River in Riga and the government of Kārlis Ulmanis had to request military assistance from Lithuania and Estonia. The Estonians sent two armoured trains to aid the Latvians while the Lithuanians were engaged in battles with the Bolsheviks and could only issue diplomatic protests. The Latvians also received assistance from the guns of a British Royal Navy destroyer, HMS Vanoc, in Riga harbour.

In November, the Latvian army managed to drive the Bermondt-Avalov forces into Lithuanian territory. Mitau was also lost. Finally, the West Russian Volunteer Army suffered heavy defeats by the Lithuanians near Radviliškis, a major railway centre.

Upon defeat Bermondt-Avalov fled to Denmark. The German Freikorps were handed over to the German Lieutenant General von Eberhardt, successor of the Goltz as commander of the VI Reserve Corps in Allenstein. After the involvement of the Entente military mission, General Eberhardt was able to organize evacuation of the remaining German Freikorps via Lithuania to East Prussia. This was completed by mid-December 1919.

Army 
The Army uniforms of the West Russian Volunteer Army were provided by Germany and decorated with Russian distinctive signs, in particular the shoulder legs according to the model of the Russian Imperial Army and an Orthodox cross worn on the left sleeve.

The army included:
  Corps Graf Keller (Colonel Potozki): from 7,000 to 10,000 soldiers, near Jelgava
  Corps Virgolitsch (Colonel Virgolitsch): from 3,500 to 5,000 soldiers, stationed in northern Lithuania
  Iron Division (Major Bischoff): about 15,000 to 18,000, at Jelgava, joined in August
   (Captain Sievert): about 9,000 to 12,000 soldiers who had come together from various independent free corps.
  Freikorps Plehwe (Captain ): about 3,000 soldiers (the former 2nd Guard Reserve Regiment), before Libau
  Freikorps Diebitsch: about 3,000 soldiers, for railway protection in Lithuania.
  : about 1,000 soldiers, appeared at the end of October after a march over 1,200 km off Riga.

See also
 White Movement
 Freikorps in the Baltic
 United Baltic Duchy
 Estonian War of Independence
 Latvian War of Independence
 Lithuanian Wars of Independence

References

Bibliography 

 Bischoff, Josef, Die letzte Front. Geschichte der Eiserne Division im Baltikum 1919, Berlin 1935.
 Darstellungen aus den Nachkriegskämpfen deutscher Truppen und Freikorps, Bd 2: Der Feldzug im Baltikum bis zur zweiten Einnahme von Riga. Januar bis Mai 1919, Berlin 1937; Bd 3: Die Kämpfe im Baltikum nach der zweiten Einnahme von Riga. Juni bis Dezember 1919, Berlin 1938.
 Die Baltische Landeswehr im Befreiungskampf gegen den Bolschewismus, Riga 1929.
 Eesti Vabadussõda 1918-1920, Tallinn, Mats, 1997. .
 Kiewisz, Leon, Sprawy łotewskie w bałtyckiej polityce Niemiec 1914-1919, Poznań 1970.
 Paluszyński, Tomasz, Walka o niepodległość Łotwy 1914-1920, Warszawa 1999.
 Von den baltische Provinzen zu den baltischen Staaten. Beiträge zur Entstehungsgeschichte der Republiken Estland und Lettland, Bd I (1917-1918), Bd II (1919-1920), Marburg 1971, 1977.

Notes

20th century in Latvia
1918 in Lithuania
Military units and formations of White Russia (Russian Civil War)
1919 in Lithuania
Anti-communist organizations